Wang Lang may refer to:

Wang Lang (Xin dynasty) (died 24), warlord during the Xin-Eastern Han transition
Wang Lang (Cao Wei) (died 228), minor warlord during the late Han period who became an official of Cao Wei
Wang Lang Market, in Bangkok Noi, Thailand
Prannok Pier or Wang Lang Pier, pier on the Chao Phraya River near Wang Lang Market

See also
Wang Lan (1922–2003), painter and author